Sir Walter Calverley, 1st Baronet (1670 – 15 October 1749) was an English aristocrat.

He was the only son of Walter Calverley of Calverley, Yorkshire, and Frances Thompson, daughter and heiress of Henry Thompson of Esholt, Yorkshire. He was baptised on 16 January 1670 at Calverley, and matriculated at Queen's College, Oxford, on 30 June 1687, aged 17.

He married Julia Blackett, eldest daughter of Sir William Blackett on 7 January 1707 at Newcastle. In about 1709, he completed the building of a new house at Esholt Hall, Esholt.

He was created a baronet on 11 December 1711. His wife died on 17 September 1736; he died on 15 October 1749, aged 79, and was buried at Calverley. He was succeeded by his son Walter.

References

Further reading

External links
 The Blacketts of North East England

1670 births
1749 deaths
Baronets in the Baronetage of Great Britain
People from Calverley